Ben Herring (born 14 March 1980) is a professional rugby coach, and served as head coach of the Otago rugby team until the 2020 season. Herring has coached two national sides, Canada and Japan, and two super franchises Highlanders and Sunwolves.

Coaching career

2009–2011

Herring was appointed assistant coach at Leicester Tigers by director of rugby Richard Cockerill. He had over 60 games as coach, including Heineken Cup semifinals and winning two Premiership titles 2008–09, 2009–10, and beaten finalist 2010–11.

2011–2013

Japanese club side the NEC Green Rockets recruited Herring to coach alongside former Blues head coach Greg Cooper. In his first season NEC finished third place, their highest finish in Top League history. In this season the club unearthed Nemani Nadolo.

2013–2015

Herring was employed by Rugby Canada to coach national representative teams both in 15s and 7s. Herring was assistant to Kieran Crowley with the national 15s team, and Geraint John with the 7s.  The national 7s side reached 6th in world its highest ever world ranking. Coaching alongside John Tait, the national woman's 7s team consistently ranked top 3 in the world.

2015–2018

Due to a growing family, Herring returned to New Zealand and became assistant coach for Otago, and a specialist coach for the Highlanders. Jamie Josephs appointment to coach the Japanese national side, saw him take Tony Brown (attack) and Ben Herring (defense) as his two assistant coaches. Herring was also appointed assistant coach to the newly formed Japanese Super team, the Sunwolves, in order to create alignment between the national and Super franchise. Japan exceeded expectation in 2016 finishing the November internationals with a last minute drop goal loss to Wales at a sold out Principality Stadium.

2018–2019

With the arrival of his fourth child Herring returned to New Zealand, where he was appointed head coach of the Otago team. In 2018 Otago won the Ranfurly shield, New Zealand's oldest trophy. The Otago team made the Championship final. He will be succeeded by Tom Donnelly for the 2020–2023 seasons.

Playing career 
Playing career

Herring played professionally from 2001 to 2009 in both New Zealand and England before his retirement through concussion. Herring was a reliable openside flanker and turnover specialist. He began his senior rugby career when he shifted from Auckland to Dunedin to study a Physical Education degree at the University of Otago. He played for the Alhambra-Union club, whose most notable All Black was fellow openside Josh Kronfeld. Herring won Otago club player of the year for his first two seasons, playing fifty games for the club, before being contracted to Southland for the start of his professional career.

In his debut season for the Southland Stags he was named Southland player of the year, scoring two highly memorable NPC tries off kick offs. The first was an intercept and an unopposed run to the line off a Southland kickoff, while the second was against Canterbury in a Ranfurly Shield challenge, when he fielded a Canterbury kickoff and ran 60 meters to score. This form won him a Super 12 contract with the Highlanders in 2002. A second season at Southland followed, where by the end of 2003 he had scored seven tries in 22 games.

In 2004 he transferred to the Hurricanes and Vodafone Wellington Lions replacing the departing Kupu Vanisi. Injury restricted him to only six Super rugby games in his debut season with the Hurricanes. He returned to play a leading role for both the capital sides, forming a regular loose forward trio with Jerry Collins and Rodney So’oialo. After notable highlights against the British and Irish lions and NPC final appearances Herring took up a contract for European giants Leicester Tigers in 2007.

Herring won Leicester Tigers newcomer of the year in 2008. After 30 Premiership and Heineken Cup appearances Herring received a series of grizzly concussions that led to his premature retirement from all rugby in January 2009.

References

 https://web.archive.org/web/20130208061638/http://hurricanes.co.nz/team/players/ben-herring
 www.thisisleicestershire.co.uk/Assistant ... Ben-Herring ... /story.html
 http://www.espnscrum.com/premiership-2010-11/rugby/story/138356.html

External links
Leicester profile

Living people
1980 births
New Zealand rugby union coaches
New Zealand rugby union players
Rugby union flankers
Leicester Tigers players
Southland rugby union players
Wellington rugby union players
Highlanders (rugby union) players
Hurricanes (rugby union) players
Rugby union players from Auckland
New Zealand expatriate rugby union players
New Zealand expatriate sportspeople in England
New Zealand expatriate sportspeople in Japan
Expatriate rugby union players in England